The following is a list of flags of Belarus.

State flag

Presidential flag

Presidential Institutions

Military flags

Governmental flags

Subdivision flags

Political flags

Minority flags

Historical flags

Former national flag proposals

See also
 Flag of Belarus
 Coat of arms of Belarus

References

External links
VEXILLOGRAPHIA - Флаги Беларуси

Flags
Lists and galleries of flags